Conrad Francis Dehn QC (24 November 1926 – 26 April 2020) was a British barrister. He died in April 2020 at the age of 93.

References

1926 births
2020 deaths
British barristers
British King's Counsel